The 2009 UNIFFAC Cup was the second UNIFFAC Cup competition to take place. All games were hosted in Limbe, Cameroon. It was contested by players under 17 years of age.

Matches

Final

External links

CafOnline.com

2009
2009
2009 in African football
2009 in Cameroonian football